Zombie is a 1995 novel by American writer Joyce Carol Oates, which explores the mind of a serial killer. It was based on the life of Jeffrey Dahmer.

Dahmer stated in an interview with Stone Phillips, "The only motive that there ever was to completely control a person, a person I found physically attractive, and keep them with me as long as possible, even if it meant keeping a part of them."

A short-film adaptation starring Bill Connington, developed from his successful one-man stage adaptation, was directed by Tom Caruso.

Plot
The protagonist, Quentin P, seeks to create a zombie out of an unsuspecting young man. He intends to find a perfect young male companion and re-wire his brain, thereby turning the victim into a mindless sex slave. His several attempts at creating a zombie, by doing improvised surgery on the victim's brain, all end in failure, however, as the men he abducts, rapes and tortures all die at his hands. By the end of the novel, he has begun to enjoy killing for its own sake.

Adding to his frustrations is his increasingly suspicious family, particularly his father.

Awards
The book won the Bram Stoker Award for Superior Achievement in a Novel.

References 

1995 American novels
Novels by Joyce Carol Oates
American novels adapted into films
American novels adapted into plays
American horror novels
American zombie novels
Novels about serial killers
Dutton Penguin books
Works about Jeffrey Dahmer
American LGBT novels
Novels with gay themes
LGBT-related horror literature
Novels about necrophilia
Bram Stoker Award for Novel winners